Robert R. L. Guillard (February 5, 1921 - September 25, 2016) was a scientist that contributed to the fields of aquaculture, oceanography, and phycology, particularly the phytoplankton. He earned his Ph.D. from Yale University. In 1958, he joined Woods Hole Oceanographic Institution as an associated scientist and later a senior scientist. In 1982, he moved to Bigelow Laboratory for Ocean Sciences where he helped establish the Provasoli-Guillard National Center for Culture of Marine Phytoplankton (CCMP). He developed the algal culture medium, f/2, which is now commonly used for laboratory studies of marine algae.

References 

1921 births
2016 deaths
American oceanographers
American phycologists
Place of birth missing
Place of death missing
Yale University alumni
Woods Hole Oceanographic Institution